The German Canadian Club Hansa is a Centre for German Cultural Heritage in Ontario's Peel Region. It is more commonly referred to as Hansa Haus.

History 
Since the late 18th century, German settlers have been among the most dominant cultural groups settling and developing Ontario's southern regions. A portion of Germans emigrating their home country post World War II settled in southern Ontario's Brampton and the surrounding areas. At that time Brampton and Peel County had many nurseries and farms where they found employment, or started their own businesses in trades they had learned in Germany before immigrating.

Early Years
A restaurant on third line and Queen St. West in Brampton, Ontario became a meeting place for many of those immigrants. Over time an idea emerged to establish a German Cultural Centre in the region. Because of the unfamiliarity with Canadian laws among most of these largely new immigrants, a more seasoned member of these social gatherings, Mr. Gerhard Neudörffer, was asked if he was willing to approach authorities. The law at the time stated that only a Canadian citizen could be President of such an organization. Since he was the only one who could give satisfaction to all the requirements of the law, he was asked to spear-head this endeavour. During the winter of 1957/58 the efforts to establish a cultural centre were intensified and in March 1958, the German Canadian Club Hansa was officially registered. Until the purchase of the clubhouse in 1962, the meetings of the newly founded organization were held at the home of the Neudörffer's family. It was also used as storage for everything concerning the club. In addition, a sizable parcel of land was bought adjacent to the newly acquired club house on Highway 10. Once all was settled the activities of the club moved to its new home. From 1966 to 1973, due to limited space at the club's facility, dances were held in various nearby Halls in Brampton. One of the club's first - and therefore oldest - under groups was the Ladies Auxiliary who made sure that the stomach came to its right during social events. Much of the credit that the Hansa Club became an institution in and around Brampton is due to this group. The Ladies Auxiliary organized traditional German Christmas parties and Easter egg hunts which remain a cultural highlights for the members and their children. During the early years the Hansa Haus Club became very active not only in social but also in community affairs. For instance, Peel Memorial Hospital was one of the beneficiaries, because the proceeds of one social dance per year were donated to the hospital. The club also sponsored a Pee Wee Baseball and Minor Hockey team and support was given to the Senators Drum and Bugle Corps. The Hansa Club took active part in the annual Flower Festival and the highlight was when the Hansa Club received first prize with a replica of the Hansa Haus at the parade. Furthermore, the Hansa Club was the first to organize a "Biergarten" during the Flower Festival, which became a favourite place to soak parched tongues and rest tired feet after the parade. With the acquisition of the property on Highway 10, the club developed tremendously spawning a wealth of under groups who all offered social, sporting and cultural events not only to its members, but also the community within its region. There were soccer teams, a choir, and folk dance groups, to name only a few. To highlight the Hansa Haus's integration into its multicultural Canadian society the club's members organized Mardi Gras dances from the early 1960s. In spring 1966 the Hansa Mardi Gras Society was formed and took over the responsibility to contributing to the naturally colourful Mardi Gras Season.

Growth
Profiting from the economic success of its members the German Canadian Club Hansa underwent a phase of heavy investment in its facilities. culminating in the opening of a new club house named "Hansa Haus" in November 1973. It was also the beginning of a changed structure of the club. Gradually the social club became a combination of club, business and cultural centre. The main purpose of the club, however, remained to keep German tradition and culture alive and share it with its diverse Canadian friends of non-German origin German traditions and culture. Having this in mind, the Hansa Club and the "Historical Society of Mecklenburg Upper Canada" agreed to convert the second floor of the now old clubhouse into a German Heritage Museum. It opened in the fall of 1983.

Present 
The board rekindled the long-standing Hansa Haus Christmas Market tradition and intends to expand its annual "Hansa goes Classic" event of classical music, opera, operetta and musical theatre. The current board remains committed to keeping Hansa Haus events open to the general public in an effort to showcase the German contribution to the rich cultural fabric of Ontario.  The membership has swelled to more than 500+ members, and countless other individuals, groups and major corporations of all facets, now enjoy the facilities that have been built by the members of the German Canadian Club Hansa to celebrate their own milestones of 60 years.

It was featured in Masterchef Canada's season 3 with the contestants serving gourmet sausages at an Oktoberfest festival hosted by Hansa Haus.

Prominent Members 
 Hazel McCallion

See also
 Canadians of German ethnicity
 Ethnic German
 Germans

References
 Hansa Haus history written in 1983
 Creating the National Mosaic: Multiculturalism in Canadian Children's Literature from 1950 To 1994
 Secret Toronto: The Unique Guidebook to Toronto's Hidden Sites, Sounds & Tastes

Further reading
 History of Ours by the German Canadian Association of Brantford
 200 Years Yonge: A History

External links
 

Buildings and structures in Mississauga
Organizations based in Mississauga
German-Canadian culture in Ontario
Culture of Mississauga